Following are presidents of Iowa State University.

Presidents of Iowa State University

Adonijah Welch 

Adonijah Strong Welch (April 12, 1821 – March 13, 1889) was the 1st president of ISU.
Born in East Hampton, Connecticut and died in Pasadena, California.

Education:
 B.A. University of Michigan
 M.A. University of Michigan
 PhD <?>

Achievements:
 First principal of Michigan State Normal School (Eastern Michigan University) from 1852 to 1865
 Senator (RepublicanR-FL) June 17, 1868 to March 3, 1869 (declined renomination to accept presidency @ ISU)
 1st ISU president from 1868 to 1883
 Design of early campus
 Helped develop agriculture and mechanical arts courses
 History of civilization and practical psychology chair from 1884 until death

Welch's first wife was Eunice P. Buckingham (married in 1859) and had three children.  After Eunice's death in 1867 he married Mary Beaumont Dudley in 1868 and had two more children.

Mary established the first courses in what would become the College of Family and Consumer Sciences.

Welch Avenue, one of the main streets in the Campustown area of Ames, is named for Welch.

Seaman A. Knapp

Seaman Asahal Knapp (December 16, 1833 – April 1, 1911) was the 2nd president of ISU.
Born in northern New York.

Education:
 Troy Conference Academy (Green Mountain College)
 Union College with Phi Beta Kappa honors

Achievements:
 Vice-president of Fort Edward Collegiate Institute (1856–1863)
 Assistant manager of Ripley Female College (Green Mountain College) (1864–1865)
 Methodist minister
 Head of the Iowa College for the Blind
 First chair of agriculture at ISU in 1879
 2nd ISU president from December 1884 to December 1885
 Started first demonstration farm in Terrell, Texas

Knapp and his wife Maria Elizabeth Hotchkiss were married in 1856 and had six children.

Knapp Street, near the ISU campus, is named for Knapp. A former residence hall named after Knapp was demolished in 2005.

Leigh S. J. Hunt
Leigh Smith John Hunt (1855 – October 5, 1933) was the 3rd president of ISU.
Born in Indiana and died in Las Vegas, Nevada.

Education:
 Undergraduate degree from Middlebury College via correspondence course
 Independent study of law; passed Indiana bar exam

Achievements:
Taught in a public school in Indiana
Superintendent of Mount Pleasant, Iowa schools in 1880
Superintendent of East Des Moines Independent School District, Des Moines, Iowa in 1882
3rd ISU president from February 1885 to July 1886
Business man:
Newspaper publisher 1886
Real estate developer
Bank president
Operated a gold mine in Korea in 1893
Grew cotton in Sudan from 1904 to 1910
Mining, agriculture, and land development in Las Vegas, Nevada

Hunt and his wife Jessie Noble were married in 1885 and had two children, Helen & Henry.

Hunt Street, near the ISU campus, is named for Hunt.

William I. Chamberlain
William Isaac Chamberlain (1837 – June 30, 1920) was the 4th president of ISU.
Born in Sharon, Connecticut and died in Cleveland, Ohio.

Education:
Western Reserve College (Case Western Reserve University); graduated 1859

Achievements:
Greek instructor at Western Reserve College after graduation from 1859 to 1865
Experimented agriculturally with fertilizers, drainage, & crop rotation
State Secretary of Agriculture of Ohio 1880 to 1886
4th ISU president from July 1886 to November 1890
Board of Trustees of Ohio State University and Ohio Experiment Station
Associate editor of the Ohio Farmer and National Stockman and Farmer

Chamberlain and his wife Lucy Jones Marshall were married on July 16, 1863 and had six children.

Chamberlain Street, in the campustown area of Ames, is named for Chamberlain.

William M. Beardshear
William Miller Beardshear (1850–1902) was the 5th president of ISU.
Born in Ohio and died in 1902 from complications of a heart attack.

Education:
Studied ministry at Otterbein College and Yale Divinity School

Achievements:
During the Civil War, he joined the Union army at the age of 14
President of Western College in Toledo, Iowa
Superintendent of schools in West Des Moines, Iowa
5th ISU president from February 1891 to August 1902
Developed new agricultural programs
Hired notable faculty:
Anson Marston
Louis B. Spinney
J.B. Weems
Perry G. Holden
Maria Roberts
Following buildings added:
Morrill Hall
Campanile
Catt Hall
Margaret Hall
School colors of cardinal & gold named
1st Bomb (yearbook) was published in 1893
Became known as the Cyclones in 1895

Beardshear Hall, on the ISU campus, is named for Beardshear. It houses university administrative offices including those of the president and the provost.

Albert B. Storms
Albert Boynton Storms (April 1, 1860 – July 1, 1933) was the 6th president of ISU.
Born in Lima Center, Michigan and died in Berea, Ohio.

Education:
A.B. University of Michigan 1884
M.A. University of Michigan 1893
PhD in divinity Lawrence University 1903
PhD in law Drake University 1905

Achievements:
Methodist minister from 1884 to 1903 in Detroit, Michigan; Madison, Wisconsin; and Des Moines, Iowa
6th ISU president from September 1903 to August 1910
Agricultural Extension Service started
Developed landscape plans and built 18 buildings:
Engineering Hall (now Marston Hall)
Central Building (now Beardshear Hall)
Alumni Hall (now the Enrollment Services Center)
Put departments under direction of deans
Diversified degrees & courses offered
Removed ban of fraternities and sororities
Resignation over the creation of the State Board of Education
Minister in Indianapolis, Indiana after ISU presidency
Superintendent of the Indianapolis, Indiana district of the Methodist Church
President of Baldwin Wallace College, Berea, Ohio

A former residence hall named after Storms was demolished in 2005.

Raymond A. Pearson
Raymond A. Pearson (1873–1939) was the 7th president of ISU.

Education:
M.S. Cornell University 1894

Achievements:
Assistant chief of the Dairy Division of the United States Department of Agriculture 1895
Professor of Dairy Science at Cornell University
New York Commissioner of Agriculture from 1908 to 1912
7th ISU president from 1912 to 1926
Completed divisional organization of undergraduate education
Graduate program given divisional status in 1915
Broadened extension service
Assistant Secretary of Agriculture during World War I from 1917 to 1918
Left for presidency at University of Maryland, College Park
20th president of University of Maryland, College Park

Pearson Hall, on the ISU campus, is named for Pearson. It houses the World Languages and Cultures department and the Graduate College. Pearson Avenue, near the ISU campus, is also named for Pearson.

Raymond M. Hughes
Raymond Mollyneaux Hughes (1873–1958) was the 8th president of ISU.
Born in Atlantic, Iowa and grew up in southwestern Ohio.

Education:
Miami University
M.S. Ohio State University 1897
Massachusetts Institute of Technology
Honorary doctorate from Miami University 1927
Honorary doctorate from Coe College 1928
Honorary doctorate from Iowa State University 1936

Achievement:
Professor of physics and chemistry at Miami University from 1898 to 1904
Dean of the College of Liberal Arts at Miami University from 1908 to 1911
President of Miami University from 1911 to 1927
8th ISU president from 1927 to 1936
Retired in 1936; continued research and teaching in Ames

Hughes married his 1st wife Ella Rogers in 1908 and after her death in 1933 he then married Helen Richardson Idsardi in 1938.

Hughes Avenue, near the ISU campus, and the former Hughes Hall were both named for Hughes.

Charles E. Friley
Charles Edwin Friley (1887–1958) was the 9th president of ISU.
Born in Louisiana to Ellen Douglas Friley and William Christopher Friley, who was the first president of Hardin-Simmons University in Abilene, Texas, and the second president of Louisiana College in Pineville, Louisiana

Education:
Sam Houston Teachers College (1905)
Baylor University (1905–1907)
B.S. Texas A&M University (1912)
M.S. Columbia University (1923)

Achievements:
Registrar of Texas A&M University (1912–1924)
Dean of School of Arts & Sciences at Texas A&M University (1924–1932)
Dean of the Division of Science at ISU (1932–1935)
Vice-president of ISU (1935–1936)
9th president of ISU from 1936 to 1953
Term lasted from the end of the Great Depression through World War II
Established the first educationally-owned/operated television station
Honorary doctorate from ISU (1958)
Mason
Fellow of the Iowa Academy of Science
National Council of Presbyterian Men
Iowa State Fair Board
Iowa Geological Society
Sigma Alpha Epsilon
Phi Kappa Phi
Phi Mu Alpha

He was married three times:
1913 to Nina Lynn Wood who died in 1918 but had two sons: Charles Edwin, Jr. & William Alva
1921 to Vera Foreman who died in 1947 but had one daughter: Frances Foreman (Kuyper)
1951 to Magdalen Ranney

Friley Road, near the ISU campus, and Friley Hall are both named for Friley. Friley Hall is one of the largest university residence halls in the United States.

James H. Hilton
James H. Hilton (1899–1982) was the 10th president of ISU.

Education:
B.S. in animal husbandry ISU (1923)
M.S. University of Wisconsin–Madison (1937)
D.Sc. Purdue University (1945)

Achievements:
County agent for Greene County (1923–1926)
In charge of dairy production teaching & research at Purdue University (1939)
Assistant chief of the dairy husbandry (1940–1945)
Head of animal husbandry at North Carolina State (1945–1948)
Dean of Agriculture at North Carolina State (1948–1953)
10th president of ISU from 1953 to 1965
Enrollment soared from 7,800 to 12,400
Value of the university increased from $38 to $471 million
Research rose to $20 million
Name change from Iowa State College to Iowa State University of Science & Technology in 1959
Director of development (1965 – ?)
Adelante Fraternity

He had two wives:
Lois Baker who died in 1969 but had three children: Eleanor, Helen, & James G.
Helen LeBaron (retired Dean of the College of Home Economics))

James H. Hilton Coliseum, on the ISU campus, is named for Hilton. It is the home of university athletic events including men's and women's basketball, volleyball, wrestling, and gymnastics. It has also hosted concerts, conferences, and other cultural and social events.

W. Robert Parks
William Robert Parks (1915–2003) was the 11th and longest-serving president of ISU.

Education:
B.A. political science Berea College, Kentucky (1937)
M.A. political science University of Kentucky (1938)
PhD political science University of Wisconsin–Madison (1945)

Achievements:
Research & administration with the Bureau of Agricultural Economics (1940–1948)
Lieutenant of the United States Navy during World War II
Professor of government at ISU (1948–1956)
Professor of agricultural economics at University of Wisconsin–Madison (1956–1958)
Dean of Instruction at ISU (1958–1961)
Vice President of Academic Affairs (1961–1965)
11th president of ISU from 1965 to 1986
Head of National Association of State Universities and Land Grant Colleges
Head of Association of American Universities
Head of Council of Presidents
Head of Mid-American State Universities Association
Head of Association of Iowa College Presidents
Member of the board of trustees of the Teachers Insurance and Annuities-College Retirement Equities Fund
On board of directors of Norwestern Bell
On board of directors of Central Life Assurance
Honorary doctorate from Bear College (1966)
Honorary doctorate from Westmar College (1968)
Honorary doctorate from Drake University (1968)
Named honorary alumnus of ISU (1969)
Honorary doctorate from University of Kentucky (1973)
Library named W. Robert and Ellen Sorge Parks Library (1984)
Received the first Christian Petersen Design Award for his leadership in establishing the College of Design
Member of FarmHouse Fraternity

He married Ellen Sorge (1914–1999) and had two daughters: Andrea (Van Howeling) and Cynthia (Hamilton).  Ellen was the first woman to receive a PhD in political science from the University of Wisconsin–Madison.

W. Robert and Ellen Sorge Parks Library, the main library on the ISU campus, is named for Parks and his wife.

Gordon P. Eaton

Gordon Pryor Eaton (1929 – ) was the 12th president of ISU.

Education:
B.A. in geology Wesleyan University (1951)

Achievements:
Faculty at Wesleyan University (1955–1959)
Faculty at University of California, Riverside (1959–1967)
Project chief of the U.S. Geological Survey in Denver (1963–1965)
Chair of the Department of Geosciences at University of California, Riverside (1965–1967)
U.S. Geological Survey (several positions)
Dean of the College of Geosciences at Texas A&M University (1981–1983)
Provost & vice president for academic affairs at Texas A&M University (1983–1986)
12th president of ISU from 1986 to 1990
Director of the Lamont-Doherty Geological Observatory at Columbia University
Director of the U.S. Geological Survey under President Bill Clinton (1994–1997)

Eaton Hall, one of ISU's residence halls, is named for Eaton.

Martin C. Jischke
Martin C. Jischke was the 13th president of Iowa State, serving from June 1, 1991 to August 14, 2000.

The Martin C. Jischke Honors Building, on the ISU campus, is named for Jischke. It is the home of the University Honors Program.

Gregory L. Geoffroy
Gregory L. Geoffroy was the 14th president of Iowa State.
He took office on July 1, 2001 and served as president until January 2012. He remains on the Iowa State faculty.

Education:
B.A. University of Louisville (1968)
PhD in chemistry California Institute of Technology (1974)

Achievements:
Officer in the United States Navy (1969–1970)
Assistant professor of chemistry at Pennsylvania State University (1974–1978)
Associate professor of chemistry at Pennsylvania State University (1978–1982)
Professor of chemistry at Pennsylvania State University (1982–1988)
Head of the department of chemistry at Pennsylvania State University (1988–1989)
Dean of the Eberly College of Science at Pennsylvania State University (1989–1997)
Senior vice president for academic affairs and provost at University of Maryland, College Park (1997–2001)
President of Iowa State University (2001 – 2011)

Geoffroy is married to Kathleen Carothers Geoffroy and has four children.

Iowa State's newest residence hall, Gregory L. Geoffroy Hall (or simply Geoffroy Hall), is named for the former president. It was opened to students in December 2016.

Steven Leath
Steven Leath was named the president-elect of Iowa State University on September 27, 2011. He took office as the 15th president of the university on January 16, 2012. He was formerly vice president for research and sponsored programs for the University of North Carolina system.

Education:
B.S. Pennsylvania State University (1979)
M.S. University of Delaware (1981)
Ph.D. in plant pathology University of Illinois (1984)

Wendy Wintersteen
Wendy Wintersteen was named president of Iowa State University on October 23, 2017, and assumed the position on November 20, 2017.

Wintersteen earned a bachelor of science in crop protection (1978) from Kansas State University and her doctorate in entomology (1988) from Iowa State.

See also
List of leaders of universities and colleges in the United States

References

Iowa State